Mount Leisler is the highest point in the Kintore Range in the south-west of the Northern Territory of Australia.

Location and features
Mount Leisler was named by William Tietkens on 27 May 1889. Tietkens was in command of the "Central Australian Exploring Expedition" 1889 under the auspices of the Royal Geographical Society of Australasia, South Australian Branch. He named Kintore Range in honour of Lord Kintore, governor of South Australia, and Mount Leisler in honour of Mr Louis Leisler of Glasgow who had provided funds for Tietkens to open up land between Fowlers Bay, South Australia and the Musgrave Ranges.

Tietkens blazed a tree at the base of the mountain with the letter T, below which were the numbers 5.89. This tree was re-discovered by Len Beadell in 1960 while building the Sandy Blight Junction Road, and some branches were still bearing foliage. The tree has since died and fallen over.

See also

 List of mountains of the Northern Territory
 Sandy Blight Junction Road
 Tietkens expedition of 1889

References

Mountains of the Northern Territory